David Coulter may refer to:

David Coulter (banker) (born 1949), director of Warburg Pincus
David Coulter (politician), Democratic Party politician and county executive of Oakland County
David Coulter (minister) (born 1957), Church of Scotland minister and RAF chaplain
David Coulter (karateka), Scottish karateka

See also
 Coulter (surname)